The Naryn Castle (In Persian: نارین قلعه) or Narin Castle is a mud-adobe fort or castle in the town of Meybod, Iran. Built some 2,000 to 6,000 years ago, it has four towers and stands 40 meters (130 ft) high and contained a plumbing system.

Architecture

The ruins of the structure stands 40 meters (130 ft) high from its base. Although built between 2,000 to 6,000 years ago, it contains what seems to be a type of plumbing system (made out of a kind of mortar called sarooj) which was built into its massive walls. Peculiarly similar in design to Ali Qapu palace of Isfahan, it has a terrace high on top of the structure whose circulation is provided by two helical stairwells (whose walls have caved in, making it inaccessible). The structure also has a large underground chamber (now filled by rubble), was possibly used as a prison. Four towers surround the entire compound, and a large gate furnishes access to a large courtyard.

This building has been built as an old fortress with three different floors, each for a different class of society.

Structures like Naryn Castle constituted the government stronghold in some of the older (pre-Islamic) towns of central Iran. Some of these castles incorporate mud bricks of the Medes period and of the Achaemenid and Sassanid dynasties.

Some believe that the Narin castles are descendants of ancient Zoroastrian fire-temples; some of the castles in Narin and Meybod, in Yazd province, are also called nareng castles (orange castles), possibly by folk etymology.

Current conditions
The castle at Meybod is currently under study but has not been faring very well. The structure seems to have been affected by numerous earthquakes throughout the ages.

Although all outer gates have been destroyed the inner castle still exists. You can still see some of the outer walls.

Gallery

See also
List of Iranian castles
Iranian architecture

Sources 

Buildings and structures completed in the 1st century
Sasanian castles
Architecture in Iran
Archaeological sites in Iran
Buildings and structures in Yazd Province
National works of Iran
Castles in Iran